This was the first edition of the tournament.

Nicoleta Dascălu won the title, defeating Irina Bara in an all-Romanian final, 7–5, 6–2.

Seeds

Draw

Finals

Top half

Bottom half

References

Main Draw

Kiskút Open - Singles